Lalgarh is a small town in Churu district in Rajasthan, India, situated on the border of the Churu and Nagaur districts. Raja Lal Singh named the village after himself, before which it was known as Kaniyana

History
 
Maharaja Ganga Singh had developed a bagichi, which has temples of Shivaji, Balaji and Santoshi Mata. A six-bed hospital was made by Kanheyalal Jain. Outside the village there is a forest of 1000 bigha. An annual fair of cattle was organized every year in the village, which is main source of getting Nagauri variety of bulls.
 
There are 1,500 families residing in the village; out of them 300 families are of  Lakhotia, Lohia, Bang, Malani, Jhawar, Bajaj, Toshniwal, swami, Bagada, Tawaniya, ojha sarswat etc.
 
In the village, there are many castes but still there is a majority of caste is only one caste these are  Jatts, Some JAT Gotra are Lohmror, Godara, Dhaka, Jakhad, Sangwa, Sirol, Jajra, Sau, Mahiya, Jyani, Kuliya,Dukiya, Potliya, dhetarwal, lochab, saran etc. Rajputs also have a majority same as Jat community, there are several types of Gotra's that the person identify as Chandarvasa or Suryavasa.  Some other Gotra's are Rathore, Shekhawat, Sodha, Bidawat, Sankhla, Jodha etc.
 
The village was established by Maharaja Lal Singh and the village was handed to Thakurs of the village.  Rajgarana of Bikaner, Rajkumari Ridhi Kanwar regularly come in the village.  The Rajput of Lalgarh made Nadnachya Mandir in end of village border.  The Mandir is sharing with 27 villages of Narnoat(Rathore).  The shows great power of community.  In the middle of village, the one big bhawan is there that name is Rajput Shabh Bhawan.  According to political views, the jats are more involved then others.  In the village, jats are also strong community as others.
 
There are many temples. Baba Ramdev temple is situated on bus stand. Shree Ram mandir is in main market.  Another temple of Baba Ramdev is on the way of boseri Nagaur.

References
Here a Balaji temple is near the pond and a Hariram Baba temple is at the bus stand. The market also has the temple of Thakur ji, the temple of Krishna Radha and the temple of Lakshmi Narayan And there are other temples.

History /About
 
Maharaja Ganga Singh had developed a bagichi, which has temples of lordShivaji, Balaji and  karniSantoshi Mata. A holy man khaki baba used to worship goddess durga whose prestige was prevailing because of miracles .Maharaja ganga singh came across Baba and breast cancer of maharani was cured by baba so king ganga constructed  a holy temple which is known as bagichi.A six-bed hospital was made by Kanheyalal Jain. Outside the village there is a forest of 1000 bigha. This land is dedicated to cow grazing  . An annual fair of cattle was organized every year in the village, which is main source of getting Nagauri variety of bulls.
 
There are 1,500 families residing in the village; out of them 300 families are of Lakhotia, Lohia, Bang, Malani, Jhawar, Bajaj, Toshniwal, swami, Bagada, Tawaniya, ojha sarswat etc.
The village was established by Maharaja Lal Singh and the village was handed to Thakurs of the village. Rajgarana of Bikaner, Rajkumari Ridhi Kanwar regularly come in the village. The Rajput of Lalgarh made Nadnachya Mandir in end of village border. The Mandir is sharing with 27 villages of Narnoat(Rathore). The shows great power of community. In the middle of village, the one big bhawan is there that name is Rajput Shabh Bhawan. According to political views, the jats are more involved then others. In the village, jats are also strong community as others.
 
There are many temples. Baba Ramdev temple is situated on bus stand. Shree Ram mandir is in main market. Another temple of Baba Ramdev is on the way of boseri NaNagaur.
gaur]].
 
Sahid Rajendra singh SM (posthumous) monument is situated near bus station.
Rathore rajendra singh was a brave, dedicated soldier of indian army.He was a grenadier while serving his second tenure at kupwara district of jammu and Kashmir with his regiment he made his supreme sacrifice on call of duty.
He was a section commander during a night patrol. His troops were ambushed by four hardcore Lasker- a -taiba militants. Being a leading troop he charged on militants instantly.
He neutralized three militants single-handed ly . In the exchange of heavy fire Rathore displayed utter course while taking care of his troops.
Bad luck was there as Rathore suffered a bullet blow direct on heart.
Nation lost a brave and very fit soldier both physically and mentally.
Lalgarh is proud of its son.

External links
Delimitation Commission Report

Villages in Churu district